Bucharest Financial Plaza is a class A office building in the city of Bucharest, Romania. It has 18 floors, with a total of 30.000 m2 of floor space. It also has 3 underground floors which are used as parking spaces for 160 cars.  Bucharest Financial Plaza is one of the tallest office buildings in Bucharest, standing at a height 83 metres. Completed in 1997, it was initially the headquarters of Bancorex, which went bankrupt two years later.

References

External links
Official site

Skyscraper office buildings in Bucharest
Calea Victoriei
Office buildings completed in 1997